Cantsfield is a civil parish in Lancaster, Lancashire, England. It contains 16 listed buildings that are recorded in the National Heritage List for England.  Of these, one is listed 
Grade II*, the middle grade, and the others are at Grade II, the lowest grade.  The major building in the parish is Thurland Castle; this building and structures associated with it 
are listed.  The parish contains the village of Cantsfield and is otherwise rural.  The other listed buildings include houses in the village, a bridge, two milestones, and two boundary stones.

Key

Buildings

References

Citations

Sources

Lists of listed buildings in Lancashire
Buildings and structures in the City of Lancaster